Walk with Me (Chinese: 双魂, literally Double Soul) is a 2019 Malaysia-Hong Kong Cantonese-language horror thriller film. The film tells the story of a woman who is started to be haunted by her childhood doll, a doll that will help her take revenge on her enemies.

It is released on 21 November 2019 in Singapore, 3 October 2019 in Malaysia, and on 22 August 2019 in Hong Kong.

Synopsis
Sam works in a sewing factory and lives with her uncaring parents, and when growing up she counts on to her favorite doll. Due to her introverted nature, she is bullied by her colleagues in her factory workplace, and is possibly sexually assaulted by her manager. Sam began to feel that there was a little girl or doll with her in the house and everywhere she went. She felt the doll was a reincarnation of her late stillborn brother. Unable to bear these pressure anymore, she resorts to asking the strange doll for help dealing with the bullies. When death happens, she fears that the doll might be responsible.

Cast
Michelle Wai
Alex Lam Tak Shun
Anna Ng
Richard Ng
Qi Yuwu

References

External links
 
 Walk with Me on Cinema.com.my

2019 films
Hong Kong supernatural horror films
Malaysian supernatural horror films
2010s Hong Kong films